Zhou Wenju (fl. 942–961), also known as Chou Wen-chu, was a Chinese painter during the Five Dynasties and Ten Kingdoms period (907–960). His exact birth and death dates are not known.

Zhou was born in Jurong, and specialized in figure painting. He worked as a painter in attendance at the Painting Academy of the Southern Tang court. It is recorded that Zhou participated in executing a joint work at the banquet held by Emperor Yuanzong of Southern Tang on New Year's Day, 947. A follower of Zhou Fang (Tang dynasty) in the Tang. Quite a few paintings are attributed to him, but none with much evidence. Most works  attributed  to him are later copies  or misatributions.

Gallery

References

External links
 In the Palace after a work attributed to Zhou Wenju at Cleveland Museum
 In the Palace  at Metropolitan Museum
 In the Palace  at Harvard Museum

Southern Tang painters
10th-century Chinese painters
Painters from Zhenjiang
People from Jurong, Jiangsu